The 1989 FIVB Women's U20 World Championship was held in Lima, Trujillo and Arequipa, Peru from August 3 to 13, 1989. 16 teams participated in the tournament.

Qualification process 

 * Chinese Taipei replaced Indonesia.

Pools composition

Preliminary round

Pool A 

|}

|}

Pool B 

|}

|}

Pool C 

|}

|}

Pool D 

|}

|}

Second round

Pool E 

|}

|}

Pool F 

|}

|}

13th–16th places 

|}

|}

Final round

9th–12th places

Classification 9th and 12th

Classification 11th

Classification 9th

5th–8th places

Classification 5th and 8th

Classification 7th

Classification 5th

Championship round

Semifinals 

|}

Bronze medal match 

|}

Gold medal match 

|}

Final standing

Individual awards 

 Best Spiker:  Paola Paz Soldan
 Best Setter:  Fernanda Venturini
 Best Blocker:  Fatima dos Santos
 Best Server:  Marcia Fu

External links 
 Informational website.

World Championship
Volleyball
FIVB Volleyball Women's U20 World Championship
1989 in youth sport